Roberto Pelizzola (born 13 October 1958 in Milan) is an Italian figure skating coach and former competitive ice dancer. He competed twice at the Olympics.

Competitive highlights

With Trovati

With Micheli

With Parisi

With Masserenz

References

Italian male ice dancers
Italian figure skating coaches
1958 births
Living people
Figure skaters from Milan
Olympic figure skaters of Italy
Figure skaters at the 1984 Winter Olympics
Figure skaters at the 1988 Winter Olympics
Universiade medalists in figure skating
Universiade bronze medalists for Italy
Competitors at the 1983 Winter Universiade